The Uganda Film Festival Award for Best Supporting Actress is an award presented annually by Uganda Communications Commission (UCC) to a female supporting actor (actress) who has exhibited outstanding acting in a film support role at the Uganda Film Festival Awards. This category was introduced in 2015 but was discontinued in 2016 and 2017 and re-introduced in 2018.

Winners and nominees
The table shows the winners and nominees for the Best Supporting Actress award.

Multiple wins and nominations
No actress has won this category multiple times. The following actresses have received two or more 
Best Supporting Actress nominations

References

Ugandan film awards
Film awards for supporting actress